Rivers Chambers was one of the major leaders in the jazz scene, part of the music of Baltimore. He was originally a pianist with John Ridgely, part of the first jazz band in Baltimore, and later led the house band at the Royal Theatre for many years. His Rivers Chambers Orchestra was a fixture on the Baltimore jazz scene for many years.

References

American jazz pianists
American male pianists
American male jazz musicians
Year of birth missing
Year of death missing